Chatino is a group of indigenous Mesoamerican languages. These languages are a branch of the Zapotecan family within the Oto-Manguean language family. They are natively spoken by 45,000 Chatino people, 
whose communities are located in the southern portion of the Mexican state of Oaxaca.

The Chatinos have close cultural and linguistic ties with the Zapotec people, whose languages form the other branch of the Zapotecan language family. Chatinos call their language chaqF tnyaJ. Chatino is recognized as a national language in Mexico.

Varieties
The Chatino languages are a group of three languages: Zenzontepec Chatino, spoken in about 10 communities in the district of Sola de Vega; Tataltepec Chatino, spoken in Tataltepec de Valdés; and a group of dialects collectively called the Eastern Chatino language, spoken in about 15–17 communities. Egland & Bartholomew (1983) conducted mutual intelligibility tests on the basis of which they concluded that four varieties of Chatino could be considered separate languages with respect to mutual intelligibility, with 80% intelligibility being needed for varieties to be considered part of the same language. (The same count resulted from a looser 70% criterion.) These were Tataltepec, Zacatepec, Panixtlahuaca, and the Highlands dialects, with Zenzontepec not tested but based on other studies believed to be completely unintelligible with the rest of the Chatino languages. The Highlands dialects fall into three groups, largely foreshadowing the divisions in Ethnologue.

Campbell (2013), in a study based on shared innovations rather than mutual intelligibility, first divides Chatino into two groups: Zenzontepec and Coastal Chatino. He then divides Coastal Chatino into Tataltepec and Eastern Chatino. His Eastern Chatino contains all the other varieties, and he finds no evidence for subgrouping or further division based on shared innovations. This division mirrors the divisions reported by Boas (1913), based on speaker comments, that Chatino comprised three "dialects" with limited mutual intelligibility. Sullivant (2016) finds that Teojomulco is the most divergent variety.

Teojomulco
Core Chatino
Zenzontepec
Coastal Chatino
Tataltepec
Eastern Chatino
Zacatepec
Highlands: Eastern (Lachao-Yolotepec), Western (Yaitepec, Panixtlahuaca, Quiahije), Nopala

Revitalization
The Mexican Secretariat of Education uses a four risk scale to measure endangered languages. The lowest is no immediate risk of disappearance, then medium risk, high risk, and lastly very high risk of disappearance. Currently, Chatino dialects vary from high risk of disappearance to medium risk to no immediate risk (and ).

In an effort to help revitalize the Chatino language, a team of linguists and professors came together to make The Chatino Language Documentation Project. The team included Emiliana Cruz, Hilaria Cruz, Eric Campbell, Justin McIntosh, Jeffrey Rasch, Ryan Sullivant, Stéphanie Villard, and Tony Woodbury. They began the Chatino Documentation Project in the summer of 2003 hoping to document and preserve the Chatino Language and its dialects. Using audio and video recordings they have been able to document the language during everyday life interactions. Up until 2003, Chatino was an oral language, with no written form. After beginning the Chatino Documentation project, the team began to create a written form of the Chatino Language. This transition has created more resources for revitalization projects. They hope the resources they have made will soon be used to create educational materials like books to help the Chatino people be able to read and write their language.

Orthography
The glottal stop is variously written as a 'q' (as here), a '7', IPA 'ʔ', or a saltillo ''. The last can be confused with the tone letter 'I' in a non-serif font.

Tone letters are capital letters A through L. These have dedicated Unicode characters, but for accessibility in this article are rendered with HTML markup.

Morphology

Transitive-Intransitive alternations

Chatino languages have some regular alternations between transitive and intransitive verbs.  In general this change is shown by altering the first consonant of the root, as in the following examples from Tataltepec Chatino:

Causative alternations

There is also a morphological causative in Chatino, expressed by the causative prefix /x-/, /xa-/, /y/, or by the palatalization of the first consonant.  The choice of prefix appears to be partially determined by the first consonant of the verb, though there are some irregular cases.
	The prefix /x/ occurs before some roots that start with one of the following consonants: /c, qu, ty/ or with the vowels /u,a/, e.g.

The prefix /xa/ is put before certain roots that begin with /t/, e.g.

Palatalization occurs in some roots that begin with /t/, e.g.

taa 'will give'
tyaa 'will pay'

(Pride 1970: 95–96)

The alternations seen here are similar to the causative alternation seen in the related Zapotec languages.

Aspect
Pride (1965) reports eight aspects in Yaitepec Chatino.

potential The majority of the verbs have no potential prefix, and its absence indicates this aspect.
habitual This is indicated by the prefixes /n-, nd-, l-/ and /n-/ with palatalization of the first consonant of the root, e.g.:
nsta		'puts it in'	
nsta chcubi loo mesa	'puts the box on the table'
nduqni cuqna 'graze'
Nduqni nguq cuqna quichi re	'The people of this town graze'
ntya	qsowq
Ntya nguq quichi re quiña	'The people of this town sow chile.'continuative'''	Roots that take /n-/ or /nd-/ in the habitual have the same in the continuative plus palatalization; roots that have /n-/ plus palatalization in the habitual have /ndya-/, e.g.Nxtya chcubi loo mesa	'is putting the box on the table'Ndyuqni nguq cuqna quichi re	'The people of this town are grazing.'Ndyata nguq quichi re quiña	'The people of this town are sowing chile.'completive	This is indicated with the prefix /ngu-/, and verbs that start with /cu-, cui-, qui-/ change to /ngu-/ and /ngüi-/ in the completive:
sta	'will put it'
Ngu-sta chcubi loo mesa	'Someone put the box on the table'
culuqu	'will teach it'
Nguluqu mstru jiqi 'The teacher taught it.'imperative	This aspect is indicated by palatalization in the first consonant of the potential form of the verb.  If the potential is already a palatalized consonant, the imperative is the same, e.g.:
sati	'will slacken',	xatiq jiqi	'let it loose!'
xiqyu	'will cut',		xiqyu jiqi	'cut it!'perfective''' This aspect is indicated by the particle /cua/, which is written as a separate word in Pride (1965).tyee		'will end'cua tyee ti	'is ended'cua ndya ngu	'is gone'
passive potential	/tya-/
Tyaala tonqniqi	'The door will be opened.'
passive completive	/ndya-/
Ndyaala tonqniqi	'The door is open.'

Syntax

Chatino languages usually have VSO as their predominant order, as in the following example:

Use and media
Chatino-language programming is carried by the CDI's radio station XEJAM, based in Santiago Jamiltepec, Oaxaca.

In 2012, the Natividad Medical Center of Salinas, California had trained medical interpreters bilingual in Chatino as well as in Spanish; in March 2014, Natividad Medical Foundation launched Indigenous Interpreting+, "a community and medical interpreting business specializing in indigenous languages from Mexico and Central and South America," including Chatino, Mixtec, Trique, and Zapotec.

See also
Chatino Sign Language, used in the Western Highland Chatino villages of San Juan Quiahije and Cieneguilla

Bibliography
Boas, Franz. 1913. "Notes on the Chatino language of Mexico," American Anthropologist, n.s., 15:78–86.
Campbell, Eric. 2013. "The Internal Diversification and Subgrouping of Chatino," International Journal of American Linguistics 79:395–420.
Cruz, Emiliana. 2004. The phonological patterns and orthography of San Juan Quiahije Chatino. University of Texas Masters Thesis. Austin.
Cruz, Emiliana and Anthony C Woodbury. 2014.  Finding a way into a family of tone languages: The story and methods of the Chatino Language Documentation Project.  Language Documentation & Conservation 8: 490—524.
Cruz, Hilaria. 2015. Linguistic poetic and rhetoric of Eastern Chatino of San Juan Quiahije (Ph.D thesis, University of Texas at Austin).
Egland, Steven, Doris Bartholomew & Saúl Cruz Ramos. 1978.  La inteligibilidad interdialectal de las lenguas indígenas de México: Resultado de algunos sondeos. Mexico City: Instituto Lingüístico de Verano (1983 reprint).
Pride, Kitty. 1965. Chatino syntax. SIL Publications in Linguistics #12.
Pride, Leslie and Kitty. 1970. Vocabulario Chatino de Tataltepec. Serie de vocabularios indigenas mariano silva y aceves,  no. 15. Summer Institute of Linguistics.
Rasch, Jeffrey Walker. 2002. The basic morpho-syntax of Yaitepec Chatino.  Ph.D. thesis.  Rice University.
Sullivant, J. Ryan. 2016. "Reintroducing Teojomulco Chatino," International Journal of American Linguistics 82:393–423.
Villard S. Grammatical sketch of Zacatepec Chatino. Master's thesis, University of Texas at Austin, Austin, Texas. 2008.

Notes

References

External links

Chatino Indian Language at native-languages.org
Resources on the Chatino languages at the website of the Chatino Language Documentation Project
Audio recordings of narratives, ceremonies, conversations, music, etc. in Amialtepec, San Juan Quiahije, Yolotepec, and Zacatepec Chatino from the Chatino Documentation of Hilaria Cruz at AILLA. 

 
Oto-Manguean languages
Indigenous languages of Mexico
Verb–subject–object languages
Articles citing INALI